Field hockey was contested for men only at the 1970 Asian Games in Bangkok, Thailand.

Medalists

Draw

Group A

*

*

Group B

*

* South Korea and Indonesia withdrew, Ceylon moved to Group A to balance the number of teams in each group.

Results

Preliminary round

Group A

Group B

Consolation round

Semifinals

7th place match

5th place match

Final round

Semifinals

Bronze medal match

Final

Final standing

References
Asian Games field hockey medalists

 
1970 Asian Games events
1970
Asian Games
1970 Asian Games